The 2021–22 season was the 108th season in the existence of Aris Thessaloniki F.C. and the club's 4th consecutive season in the top flight of Greek football since their return there. In addition to the Super League 1, Aris were participating in this season's editions of the Greek Cup and the inaugural edition of UEFA Europa Conference League.

First-team squad

Transfers and loans

Transfers in

Transfers out

Loans In

Loans Out

Transfer summary 

Spending

Summer:  3.500.000 €

Winter:  200.000 €

Total:  3.700.000 €

Income

Summer:  720.000 €

Winter:  0 €

Total:  720.000 €

Net Expenditure

Summer:  2.780.000 €

Winter:  200.000 €

Total:  2.980.000 €

Pre-season friendlies

Competitions

Overall

Overview 

{| class="wikitable" style="text-align: center"
|-
!rowspan=2|Competition
!colspan=8|Record
|-
!
!
!
!
!
!
!
!
|-
| Super League 1

|-
| Greek Cup

|-
| UEFA Europa Conference League

|-
! Total

{| class="wikitable" style="text-align: center"
|-
!rowspan=2|Super League 1
!colspan=8|Record
|-
!
!
!
!
!
!
!
!
|-
| Regular Season

|-
| Play-off Round

|-
! Total

Managers' Overview

Akis Mantzios
{| class="wikitable" style="text-align: center"
|-
!rowspan=2|Competition
!colspan=8|Record
|-
!
!
!
!
!
!
!
!
|-
| Super League 1

|-
| Greek Cup

|-
| UEFA Europa Conference League

|-
! Total

Apostolos Terzis
{| class="wikitable" style="text-align: center"
|-
!rowspan=2|Competition
!colspan=8|Record
|-
!
!
!
!
!
!
!
!
|-
| Super League 1

|-
| Greek Cup

|-
| UEFA Europa Conference League

|-
! Total

Germán Burgos
{| class="wikitable" style="text-align: center"
|-
!rowspan=2|Competition
!colspan=8|Record
|-
!
!
!
!
!
!
!
!
|-
| Super League 1

|-
| Greek Cup

|-
| UEFA Europa Conference League

|-
! Total

Super League 1

Regular season

League table

Results summary

Results by matchday

Matches

Play-off Round

League table

Results summary

Results by matchday

Matches

Greek Football Cup

Round of 16

Quarter-finals

UEFA Europa Conference League

Second qualifying round

Squad statistics

Appearances

Goals

Clean Sheets

Players' awards

Interwetten Best Goal (Super League 1)

Interwetten Player of the Month (Super League 1)

NIVEA MEN Player of the Club

References

External links 

Aris Thessaloniki F.C. seasons
Aris Thessaloniki
Aris